Alexander Zverev defeated Novak Djokovic in the final, 6–4, 6–3 to win the singles tennis title at the 2018 ATP Finals.	It was his first ATP Finals title.

Grigor Dimitrov was the reigning champion, but failed to qualify this year.

Rafael Nadal withdrew from the event due to an abdominal injury and was replaced by John Isner. As a result, Djokovic secured the year-end world No. 1 ranking.
Juan Martín del Potro qualified for the first time since 2013, but withdrew with a knee injury and was replaced by Kei Nishikori. 

Kevin Anderson and Isner made their tournament debuts.

Seeds

Alternates

Draw

Finals

Group Guga Kuerten

Group Lleyton Hewitt
Standings are determined by: 1. number of wins; 2. number of matches played; 3. in two-player ties, head-to-head records; 4. in three-player ties, percentage of sets won, then percentage of games won, then ATP rankings.

References

External links 
Official website
Singles main draw

Singles